Homoeocera stictosoma is a moth of the subfamily Arctiinae. It is found in Colombia and Panama.

References

Euchromiina
Moths described in 1874